The Landmark is a postmodern supertall skyscraper in Abu Dhabi, United Arab Emirates. Construction on the skyscraper started in late 2006 and the building was completed in 2013. It is the second tallest building in Abu Dhabi behind the Burj Mohammed bin Rashid in the Central Market Project World Trade Center complex.

See also

 List of tallest buildings in the United Arab Emirates
 List of tallest buildings in Abu Dhabi

References

Skyscrapers in Abu Dhabi
César Pelli buildings
2013 establishments in the United Arab Emirates